Studia Mathematica is a triannual peer-reviewed scientific journal of mathematics published by the Polish Academy of Sciences. Papers are written in English, French, German, or Russian, primarily covering functional analysis, abstract methods of mathematical analysis, and probability theory. The editor-in-chief is Adam Skalski.

History
The journal  was established in 1929 by Stefan Banach and Hugo Steinhaus and its first editors were Banach, Steinhaus and Herman Auerbach.

Due to the Second World War publication stopped after volume 9 (1940) and was not resumed until volume 10 in 1948.

Abstracting and indexing
The journal is abstracted and indexed in:
Current Contents/Physical, Chemical & Earth Sciences
MathSciNet
Science Citation Index
Scopus
Zentralblatt MATH
According to the Journal Citation Reports, the journal has a 2018 impact factor of 0.617.

References

External links

Mathematics journals
Publications established in 1929
Polish mathematics
Multilingual journals
Polish Academy of Sciences academic journals